Cardot is a French surname. Notable people with the surname include:

Jean Cardot (1930–2020), French sculptor
Jules Cardot (1860–1934), French botanist and bryologist
Marie-Hélène Cardot (1899–1977), French resistance fighter and politician 

French-language surnames